Paul Lambert (born November 21, 1975) is a former professional Canadian football offensive guard. He most recently played for the Montreal Alouettes.

Early years 
Lambert grew up in Montreal and played for the North Shore Lions, Sun Youth Hornets, Vanier College Cheetahs at Lennoxville Cougars. Lambert played in the local football system until university, when he was granted a scholarship to Western Michigan. He was selected for the first-team, All-Mid American Conference as a senior in 2000 as an O-lineman.

Professional career 
Lambert was drafted in the third round of the 2000 CFL Draft by the Hamilton Tiger-Cats and, in the 2001 CFL season, selected as the Tiger-Cats Rookie of the Year, starting in all regular season games and two playoff games.

In February 2003, Lambert signed with the Alouettes.  He won the 2009 Grey Cup with Montreal and earned a ring with Montreal when the team won the 2010 Grey Cup while he was on the injured roster.

On January 19, 2011, it was announced that the Alouettes had granted Lambert his request for a release.

Speculation is that Lambert will join the McGill Redmen Football coaching staff. He will join Matthieu Quiviger (ex-Redmen-CFLer)in coaching the offensive line.

Personal life 
Lambert has 2 kids named Tatum Lambert, Jake Lambert and Ellie Lambert.

References

1975 births
Living people
Canadian football offensive linemen
Montreal Alouettes players
Mount Royal University alumni
Canadian football people from Montreal
Western Michigan Broncos football players
Anglophone Quebec people